The 2003 Road America 500 was the sixth race of the 2003 American Le Mans Series season.  It took place at Road America, Wisconsin on August 24, 2003.

Official results
Class winners in bold.  Cars failing to complete 75% of winner's distance marked as Not Classified (NC).

Statistics
 Pole Position - #1 Infineon Team Joest - 1:52.265
 Fastest Lap - #1 Infineon Team Joest - 1:54.613
 Distance - 514.655 km
 Average Speed - 185.623 km/h

External links
  
 Race Results

Road America
Road America 500
Road America 500
Road America 500